Eric Lane (born January 6, 1959 in Oakland, California) is a former American football running back who played seven seasons for the Seattle Seahawks of the National Football League from 1981–1987.

1959 births
Living people
American football running backs
BYU Cougars football players
Seattle Seahawks players
National Football League replacement players